The 2007 Brownlow Medal was the 80th year the award was presented to the player adjudged the fairest and best player during the Australian Football League (AFL) home and away season. Jimmy Bartel of the Geelong Football Club won the medal by polling twenty-nine votes during the 2007 AFL season.

Leading vote-getters 
Jimmy Bartel won by seven votes despite missing the final two games after having an appendectomy.  polled the most votes of all teams with 108 total votes, although ,  and  also had 16 players receive votes. Chris Judd was the early leader, setting the record for polling votes in the most consecutive games with votes in the first eight games, before not receiving another vote for the remainder of the season.

* The player was ineligible to win the medal due to suspension by the AFL Tribunal during the year.

Voting procedure 
The three field umpires (those umpires who control the flow of the game, as opposed to goal or boundary umpires) confer after each match and award three votes, two votes, and one vote to the players they regard as the best, second-best and third-best in the match, respectively. The votes are kept secret until the awards night, and they are read and tallied on the evening.

Controversy 
The lack of votes for key forwards and backmen compared to midfielders was widely criticised, with some claiming that it is now only a midfielders medal. The only non-midfielder in the top ten votegetters was Coleman Medalist, Jonathan Brown and pre-count second favourite and key defender, Chad Cornes who only polled 12 votes to finish outside the top 20.

Ineligible players 
As the medal is awarded to the fairest and best player in the league, those who have been suspended during the season by the AFL Tribunal (or, who avoided suspension only because of a discount for a good record or an early guilty plea) are ineligible to win the award; however, they may still continue to poll votes. This caused some confusion, as with the points system in use, a player can be ineligible if they were found guilty, but due to points discounts from a previous good record or guilty plea, they were not actually suspended during the year. In the weeks before the count it was discovered that Brett Kirk was ineligible due to a guilty plea in round 8, but remained active in the betting markets for the remainder of the season.

 Heath Black
 Nathan Bock
 Amon Buchanan
 Shaun Burgoyne
 Josh Carr
 Adam Cooney
 Ryan Crowley
 Aaron Davey
 Ben Dixon
 Nathan Eagleton
 Dustin Fletcher
 Fraser Gehrig
 Adam Goodes

 Ben Holland
 Rhan Hooper
 Ben Johnson
 Daniel Kerr
 Brett Kirk
 Anthony Rocca
 Jason Roe
 Dean Solomon
 Colin Sylvia
 Damon White
 Lance Whitnall
 Michael Wilson

Source

References 

Brownlow Medal
Brownlow Medal
Brownlow Medal